Ligerin is an antiproliferative sesquiterpene with the molecular formula C20H31ClO7 which is produced by a Penicillium species.

References 

Ligerin
Esters
Carboxylic acids
Organochlorides
Epoxides